Premio Iberoamericano Planeta-Casa de América de Narrativa was a Latin American Spanish language literary award. The winner received US$200,000 making it one of the richest literary prizes in the world. Beyond the large endowment, the award was also notable for the large number of books which were judged; in 2010 over 600 books entered the award, far surpassing the approximately 120 books which entered the Man Booker Prize, for example.

The first award was in 2007. It was given annually, generally in March, in a Latin American capital that was designated each year. The Prize was for an unpublished text written in Spanish, and had an endowment of $200,000 for the winner and $50,000 for the runner-up. The goal of the award was to promote Spanish-language fiction in all Latin American countries. The prize was sponsored by Grupo Planeta, one of the largest publishers in the world. The jury was composed of five members: one representative of each of the two convening entities (Editorial Planeta and Casa de América) and three personalities in the world of Latin American literature.

The 2010 Prize, that was to be given in Valparaíso, Chile, was suspended because of the 2010 Chile earthquake. In 2011 there was no runner-up prize. After 2012, the prize was canceled.

Winners and runner(s)-up

Blue Ribbon = winner
 Runner(s)-up
2007 Bogotá, Colombia
 Pablo de Santis, El enigma de París
Alonso Cueto, El susurro de la mujer ballena

2008 Buenos Aires, Argentina
 Jorge Edwards, La Casa de Dostoievsky
Fernando Quiroz, Justos por pecadores

2009 Mexico City, Mexico
 Ángela Becerra, Ella, que todo lo tuvo
Pedro Ángel Palou, El dinero del diablo

2010 Valparaíso, Chile
 Suspended because of the 2010 Chile earthquake.

2011 Santiago, Chile
 Antonio Skármeta, Los días del arco iris
No runner-up.

2012 Madrid, Spain
 Jorge Volpi, La tejedora de sombras
10 runners-up.

References

External links
Planeta-Casa de América de Narrativa, official website

Spanish literary awards
Spanish-language literary awards
Awards established in 2007
2007 establishments in Spain
2013 disestablishments in Spain
Fiction awards
Literary awards honoring unpublished books or writers
Planeta literary awards